Blacon is a council estate on the outskirts of Chester, England. It was once one of the largest council housing estates in Europe.

Geography

Blacon is next to the Welsh border, on a hill one mile north-west of and overlooking Chester. The village is built on what was previously farmland and is surrounded by open countryside. Blacon has views across to the city centre of Chester and to the Welsh hills twenty miles to the west.
Other nearby places include Upton-by-Chester to the north, Saughall and Mollington to the north-west, Newtown to the north-east and the border town of Saltney to the south. Blacon also has a close proximity to the Wirral, being 12 miles from the village of Overpool.

History

North Blacon (Blacon Hall)

Blacon was originally known as Blakon Hill and was owned by the Marquess of Crewe.
The Parish of Blacon cum Crabwall was formed in 1923, and on 1 April 1936, under the Cheshire County Review Order, 1936, most of the parish was transferred to Chester County Borough.

It was a small farming village community until major building work by Chester City Council began in the early 1950s. Most of the older and original estate, was built in the ten years to 1960; though further parts were added on the old army camp site in South Blacon, in the late 1960s, 1970s and 1980s. 'The Parade' Shops, built in 1954 in north Blacon, are an example of Chester City Council building. In 2015, the Parade Enterprise Centre opened, a joint venture between Avenue Services and Cheshire West and Chester Council. The Parade Enterprise Centre houses Sanctuary Housing, Blacon Library, as well as a community hall and various other offices for local businesses.

Blacon Camp (Blacon Lodge)
The British Army maintained an army camp in south Blacon, from just before, to just after, the Second World War. A mixture of wooden and 'Nissen' huts were occupied by soldiers until the late 1950s; and the army firing range was still in evidence until the Chester City Council 'tower block' buildings of the mid-1960s. Blacon Camp housed various military operations, containing aircraft and war prisoners at the time. This part of (South) Blacon is referred to as 'The Camp' by local residents.

Community initiatives
The Blacon Together Pathfinder was established in 2001 as part of the first round of Pathfinders and subsequently the Blacon community took part in many initiatives, led by the government's Neighbourhood Management Pathfinder Programme, and a number of projects have been established by, and for, Blacon residents.

Progress to improve the estate continues apace, with work done by the Blacon Community Trust in partnership with the Chester and District Housing Trust forming 'The Blacon Alliance'.

Policing
Blacon is home to the new headquarters of the Western Division of the Cheshire Constabulary.

Schools

Primary
 Highfield Community Primary School
 J H Godwin Primary School
 Dee Point Primary School
 St Thereas's Catholic Primary School
 The Arches Community Primary School
Chester Blue Coat CE Primary School

Secondary
 Blacon High School, previously a specialist Sports College school
 Building Young People's Potential (BYPP) – formerly: Blacon Young Peoples Project (commonly known as the Delta Centre) (not currently in service plans to relocate the BYPP to the current location of the Blacon Library due to the original building being destroyed for re-building)

Former
 Bishop's School
 Charles Kingsley Secondary School for Girls
Queens Park High
Blacon High 
Upton High

Places of worship
There are several places of worship in Blacon to cater for Christian and Islamic faiths.  Holy Trinity-Without-The-Walls is the Church of England parish church. St Theresa's is the Roman Catholic Church, erected in 1959 with the support of the local Catholic Community; it is associated with a primary school of the same name and which is located behind the church. The primary school was formed by the combination of the former Our Lady of Mount Carmel Middle School and St Theresa's Junior School which was situated on Blacon Point Road. 
The Kingdom Hall of Jehovah's Witnesses is on Melbourne Road. 
There is a Shah Jalal Mosque on Clifton Drive to the south of the suburb.

Blacon Cemetery
Blacon Cemetery was laid out in 1940, during the Second World War, when two plots, in Sections A and H, were set aside for service burials. The cemetery's first interment took place on 20 December 1941. The cemetery contains in all the war graves of 461 Commonwealth service personnel, including an unidentified Royal Air Force airman, and 97 war graves of other nationalities (86 of them Polish servicemen from various hospitals in the area) that are maintained by the Commonwealth War Graves Commission.  The plot in Section A was a Royal Air Force regional cemetery for air personnel from bases in Cheshire and neighbouring counties, while members of other armed services were buried in Section H.

In 1965 Chester Crematorium, built with garden of remembrance adjoining Section A, was opened.  The original chapel was replaced with a new larger chapel that was built alongside it and opened in April 2013.  The site of the older building, after its demolition, has been utilised as a memorial garden.

Blacon railway station

Blacon station was served from Chester Northgate Station, Newtown, but was closed to passengers on 9 September 1968 as part of the 'Beeching Axe' for the economic modernisation of the British railway network in the mid-1960s. Freight trains ran through Blacon until 20 April 1984, resuming as a single track line on 31 August 1986 before closing again in 1992.

Although the old station and railway line have gone, they have been replaced with a tarmac road surface, which now provides a cycle path, jogging track and a countryside walkway.
This amenity is accessed from the side of old Blacon station bridge; but its route can also be joined (just off) Chester's 'Fountain' roundabout, travelling via Blacon, and on to the North Wales countryside. Other joined routes can be accessed along the way.

In 2008, a volunteer group headed by Stephen Perry in association with the Blacon Community Trust began to raise support for a major improvement of the Blacon Railway Station site. Improvements to date have included woodland sculptures, clearing and new planting of shrubs and trees and the planting of narcissi with much volunteer involvement from local schools and residents. The site (in November 2009) was undergoing phase 2 of a major development to introduce pathways, fencing and special hard-landscaping features. The community trust placed a large train wheel mosaic consisting of pieces from schools and services local to the Blacon area.

As of July 2015, the Blacon Railway has been refurbished and fully maintained. There now exists new stairs and ramps for easy access, sings containing the history of the station (exact contents will be given at a later date), and various landscaping improvements to increase appearance and appeal. There also exists a large concrete circle at the center of the station, which contains various carvings into concrete slabs and pieces arranged into sections. These segments were carved by various school children and teenagers from the local schools and projects, and contain each student's particular activity, object or person that they at the time cherished the most.

Politics

Local government changes, April 2009

Blacon consisted of two Chester City Council wards, each of which elected three councillors. Chester City Council became defunct on 1 April 2009 due to structural changes.

Cheshire West and Chester (CWAC) is the successor unitary authority area with borough status, in the ceremonial county of Cheshire. It was established in April 2009 as part of the 2009 structural changes to local government in England, by virtue of an order under the Local Government and Public Involvement in Health Act 2007.

Blacon Hall ward
Population: 7,977 (2001 census)
 John Price, Deputy Leader of the council, Labour
 Judith Stainthorp, Labour
 Norman Stainthorp, Labour

Blacon Lodge ward
Population: 5,518 (2001 census)
 Reggie Jones, Labour
 Marie Nelson, Labour
 Ethel Price, Labour

Cheshire County Council
Blacon had Labour representation on the former Cheshire County Council.

UK Parliament
Blacon, as part of the City of Chester constituency, is represented in the UK Parliament by Samantha Dixon, of the Labour Party, since December 2022.

References and notes

External links

 Socio-economic profile of Blacon

Villages in Cheshire